Josef Michel Dischel (24 August 1909 – 11 May 1984), known by his adopted stage name Peter Sturm, was an Austrian and an East German actor.

Biography

Early life
Dischel was born into a religious Jewish family in Vienna. His father was a tailor, originally from the Polish regions of the Habsburg Empire, and died in 1915. His mother was born in Hungary.

Dischel had taken up an apprenticeship as a textile merchant, but abandoned it. He then decided to become an actor, and began taking drama lessons from renowned Austrian performer Raoul Aslan. While studying, he worked as a radio mechanic. After completing his studies, he assumed the stage name Peter Sturm. He joined the Social Democratic Party of Austria when he was nineteen years old, and later turned to an active member of the Communist Party of Austria, that was declared illegal by Chancellor Engelbert Dollfuss. In 1935, he was convicted of high treason and condemned to two and a half years in prison. Sturm eventually served eighteen months, in the Stein an der Donau prison and in the Wöllersdorf detention camp. In 1936, subsequent to his release, he joined the cast of Brettl am Alsergrund, a political, left-leaning kabarett in Vienna's Alsergrund district, that was managed by Leon Askin and commonly known as Das ABC Kabarett. The actor was one of the cabaret's three declared communists, alongside Jura Soyfer and Robert Klein-Lörk.

Holocaust
In May 1938, after the Anschluss, Sturm was arrested and sent to the Dachau concentration camp. In August, he was transferred to the Buchenwald concentration camp, where he was held in the same barrack with actor Fritz Grünbaum. He was registered as an Austrian political prisoner. In April 1939, Sturm was released from Buchenwald and allowed to leave Germany. He emigrated to Italy, spending three months in Milan. Then, he illegally crossed the border into France, settling in Marseilles. After the Second World War broke out in September, he was interned in the Camp des Milles, where he acted in the camp's makeshift theater. On 27 June 1941, shortly after France surrendered to Germany, the camp's residents were to be evacuated on a train to Bayonne. Sturm managed to escape. He lived in Marseilles until August 1942, when he was deported to the Drancy internment camp, from which he was sent to the Auschwitz concentration camp. He was held in the Blechhammer sub-camp, where he was forced to serve as a barber. Occasionally, when the guards authorized it, he participated in theater evenings. In January 1945, the prisoners were evacuated to Buchenwald in a death march. Sturm survived it and wrote an account on the march shortly after arriving in Buchenwald. He joined the camp's communist underground organization. While in Buchenwald, he was a member of the building detachment headed by Robert Siewert. During the Holocaust, his mother was murdered in Auschwitz. Buchenwald was liberated on 11 April 1945.

Later years
Sturm returned to Vienna, where he resumed his acting career and worked as a radio presenter. He appeared regularly on the stage of the Theater in der Josefstadt, and later joined the cast of the New Theater in the Scala in the city's Wieden district, then in the Soviet-administrated zone. The theater, opened in 1948, was founded by communist exiles who returned to Austria after the end of the war. Sturm made his debut on screen in the 1956 film adaptation of the operetta Gasparone. During the same year - after the Soviet withdrawal from Austria left it without financial and political support - the Scala had to be closed. With several other fellow actors from the theater, Sturm left Vienna and emigrated to the German Democratic Republic, settling in East Berlin. There, director Wolfgang Langhoff took him into the Deutsches Theater, in which he remained a member of the regular cast. In 1960, he performed the role of August Rose, a Buchenwald prisoner who betrays his friends, in a television production based on Bruno Apitz's novel Naked Among Wolves. On 30 March 1961 Sturm was awarded the Art Prize of the German Democratic Republic. In 1963, when he was requested to play August Rose once more for Frank Beyer's film remake of the series, Apitz and Beyer had to convince him to agree. Sturm was badly depressed by the work on Naked Among Wolves, and became very ill after the filming ended. He was involved in the commemoration of Buchenwald's victims until his departure.

Sturm had a long career as an actor with DEFA and DFF in East Germany, appearing in more than fifty cinema and television productions.

Filmography

References

Annotations

External links

 .
Peter Sturm's memoirs about the death march from Blechhammer to Buchenwald. Published by the Ghetto Fighters' House (1988).

1909 births
1984 deaths
Male actors from Vienna
Austro-Hungarian Jews
Austrian communists
People convicted of treason against Austria
Jewish Austrian male actors
Austrian male stage actors
Austrian male film actors
Dachau concentration camp survivors
Auschwitz concentration camp survivors
Buchenwald concentration camp survivors
German male stage actors
German male film actors
German male television actors
Recipients of the Art Prize of the German Democratic Republic
20th-century German male actors
20th-century Austrian male actors
Austrian emigrants to East Germany